= The Mammoth Dictionary of Symbols =

Reference work by Nadia Julien

- Author: Nadia Julien
- Language: English
- Genre: Reference
- Publisher: Robinson Publishing
- Publication date: 1996
- Publication place: United States

The Mammoth Dictionary of Symbols is a reference work by Nadia Julien published by Robinson in 1996.

== Contents ==
The Mammoth Dictionary of Symbols posits the two premises that symbols as a concept are now obsolete, and that symbols are actually material objects.

== Reception ==
Tim Smith reviewed The Mammoth Dictionary of Symbols for Arcane magazine, rating it a 3 out of 10 overall. Smith comments that "Definitions such as: 'There is a tradition that says that swallows receive the souls of dead kings', or: 'Footwear is an indispensable item of dress in temperate regions', further undermine this as a reference work. That said, it could make a decent enough bog-read if only so you can fill in the gaps yourself."
